Brazhyne is an urban-type settlement in Snizhne urban hromada, Horlivka Raion, Donetsk Oblast (province) of eastern Ukraine. Population:

Demographics
Native language as of the Ukrainian Census of 2001:
 Ukrainian 18.72%
 Russian 81.01%

References

Urban-type settlements in Horlivka Raion
Horlivka Raion